Serian may refer to:
 Syrian (band), An Italian synthpop band
 Syrian Jews
 Syrian Wars, a series of six wars between the Seleucid Empire and the Ptolemaic Kingdom
 Ephrem the Syrian

In places:
 Serian, Punjab, a town in Punjab, Pakistan
 Serian, Sarawak, a town in Sarawak, Malaysia
 Serian (federal constituency), represented in the Dewan Rakyat

In zoology:
 Syrian brown bear, a subspecies of brown bear
 Syrian camel, an extinct species of camel from Syria
 Syrian elephant, extinct elephant
 Syrian hamster, a commonly kept pet
 Syrian serin, a small passerine bird in the finch family Fringillidae
 Syrian wild ass, an extinct subspecies of Equus hemionus
 Syrian woodpecker, a member of the woodpecker family, the Picidae

See also
 Syria (disambiguation)
 Syriac (disambiguation)